Miss Tiffany's Universe now known as Miss Tiffany is a beauty pageant for Thai transgender women in Pattaya, Thailand. It has taken place annually since 1998. The winner will represent Thailand at Miss International Queen pageant.

The reigning Miss Tiffany is Kwang Arissara Kankla of Ubon Ratchathani. She was crowned on 27 November 2022 by Judge Kristopher Kida of Clifton, New Jersey.

Background 
The contest is open to all transgender women who may or may not have gone through sex reassignment surgery. "Ladyboy" or "kathoey" are commonly used terms in Thailand to describe effeminate gay male or transgender women.  Each year, about 100 candidates from across Thailand apply to take part in the pageant. All contestants need to have Thai nationality and be between the age of 18 and 25. Contestants under the age of 20 are required to obtain parental permission to be eligible. Contestants come from a variety of backgrounds, including university students, doctors, engineers, pharmacists, etc. Once chosen to participate in the pageant, the contestants are judged based on physical attributes and overall performance in accordance to the feminine ideal.

The Miss Tiffany's Universe winner receives a trophy and crown, Honda Jazz, cash prizes, jewellery, and other gifts from sponsors. Besides the overall winner, other awards include Miss Photogenic, Miss Sexy Star, Miss Congeniality, and Miss Popular Vote. Miss Tiffany's Universe is Thailand's official representative to Miss International Queen. The Miss Tiffany’s Universe contest held once a year is receiving more attention especially since it is broadcast live on Thai television with an average of 15 million viewers. 

Miss Tiffany's Universe is a registered trademark of Tiffany's Show Pattaya Co, Ltd. The organization supports charity events for the less fortunate and supports The Royal-sponsored AIDS Foundation. The goal of this contest is to promote the rights and equality and improve the quality of life for transgender persons in Thailand. The pageant is also a source of significant income and opens up opportunities for pageant contestants.

Miss Tiffany's Universe winners

Winners by province

Winners by region

Miss International Queen 
Color keys

Past Franchises

Queen of the Universe
Color keys

See also

References

External links
Official Website 
Official Youtube Channel 
Tiffany's Show Pattaya Company
 Documentary Film on Miss Tiffany Universe

Miss Tiffany's Universe
Beauty pageants in Thailand
Transgender beauty pageants
LGBT events in Thailand
Events in Pattaya
Recurring events established in 2004
2004 establishments in Thailand
Thailand